A gross-up clause is a provision in a contract which provides that all payments must be made in the full amount, free of any deductions without exercising any right of set-off. The provision will usually indicate that if there is a mandatory withholding or deduction by operation of law (usually with respect to tax), then the paying party shall "gross up" the payment so that the receiving party receives the same net amount.

A gross-up clause is also used when a payment that is made will be subject to taxes and the payer makes an additional payment to indemnify the recipient against the taxes – that payment will also be subject to tax. The sequence of additional payment, tax calculation, additional payment continues until the recipient receives the same amount, net of all the taxes, as would have been received had there been no taxes. 

The formula for calculating the total amount of a grossed-up payment is (the amount of the payment) divided by (1 minus the tax rate). Thus, a $10,000 payment to a recipient who has a 35% tax rate would be ($10,000) / (1–35%) = (10,000/.65) = $15,384.62.

Sample clause

"All payments to be made under this Agreement shall be made in cleared funds, without any deduction or set-off and free and clear of and without deduction for or on account of any taxes, levies, imports, duties, charges, fees and withholdings of any nature now or hereafter imposed by any governmental, fiscal or other authority save as required by law.  If a Party to this Agreement is compelled to make any such deduction, it will pay to the receiving Party such additional amounts as are necessary to ensure receipt by the receiving Party of the full amount which that party would have received but for the deduction."

External links
"How to Calculate Federal & State Taxes for Gross-Up Purposes"

Contract clauses
Payments
Business terms
Loans